Colby is a civil parish in the Eden District, Cumbria, England. It contains three buildings that are recorded in the National Heritage List for England. Of these, one is listed at Grade II*, the middle of the three grades, and the others are at Grade II, the lowest grade.  The parish contains the village of Colby and the surrounding countryside, and the listed buildings consist of farmhouses and farm buildings.


Key

Buildings

Notes and references

Notes

Citations

Sources

Lists of listed buildings in Cumbria